Claude Earl "Tiny" Thornhill (April 14, 1893 – June 30, 1956) was an All-American college football player at Pittsburgh and the head football coach at Stanford from 1933 to 1939.

Playing career
Thornhill played college football at the University of Pittsburgh under legendary coach Glenn "Pop" Warner. An All-American guard and tackle, Thornhill was given the ironic nickname "Tiny" due to his imposing size. Following his graduation from Pitt, Tiny became an assistant coach to Pop Warner but left midway through the season to play pro football with the Massillon Tigers, with teammates that included Knute Rockne, Jock Sutherland, Gus Dorais, Bob Higgins, and Bob Peck. He also played in the first-ever National Football League season in 1920 for the Cleveland Tigers and Buffalo All-Americans.

Coaching career
After leaving pro football, Thornhill returned to Pitt as an assistant coach to Warner. In 1922, Warner accepted the head coaching position at Stanford, but as he had two years to finish his contract at Pitt, sent Thornhill and Andrew Kerr ahead to coach Stanford in preparation of his arrival in 1924.

Thornhill served as offensive line coach under Warner until 1933, when Warner left Stanford to take the head coaching job at Temple University and Thornhill was named head coach. In his first three years, Thornhill's team, which had named itself the Vow Boys due to their promise never to lose to USC, led his Indians to the Rose Bowl each season. Thornhill was the first Stanford coach to lead his team to postseason play in his first three seasons, a feat not matched until David Shaw's 2011 to 2013 teams. Stanford lost Thornhill's first two appearances, but won the 1936 Rose Bowl over SMU, 7–0.

After the first three seasons, Thornhill's teams went steadily downhill, culminating in a 1–7–1 season in 1939, after which Thornhill was fired and replaced by Clark Shaughnessy.

Thornhill died in Berkeley, California in 1956 of a heart ailment. He was inducted into the Beaver County Sports Hall of Fame in 1978.

Head coaching record

References

External links
 

1893 births
1956 deaths
American football guards
American football tackles
Buffalo All-Americans players
Centre Colonels football coaches
Cleveland Tigers (NFL) players
Massillon Tigers players
Pittsburgh Panthers football players
Stanford Cardinal football coaches
Sportspeople from Richmond, Virginia
Coaches of American football from Virginia
Players of American football from Richmond, Virginia
Pittsburgh Panthers football coaches